The Republic of China Navy (ROCN), also called the ROC Navy and colloquially the Taiwan Navy, is the maritime branch of the Republic of China Armed Forces (ROCAF).

The service was formerly commonly just called the Chinese Navy during World War II and prior to the ROC's retreat from the mainland. While still sometimes used especially in domestic circles, it is now not as often used internationally due to the current ambiguous political status of Taiwan and to avoid confusion with the People's Liberation Army Navy of the People's Republic of China (PRC).

Today, the ROC Navy's primary mission is to defend the remaining ROC's territories and the sea lanes under its jurisdiction against any possible blockades, attacks, or invasion. Operations include maritime patrols in the Taiwan Strait and surrounding waters, as well as readiness for counter-strike and counter-invasion operations during wartime. The Republic of China Marine Corps (ROCMC) also functions as a branch of the Navy.

The ship prefix for ROCN combatants is ROCS (Republic of China Ship); an older usage is CNS (Chinese Navy Ship).

Organization

Republic of China Navy Command Headquarters 

The Navy CHQs is subordinate to the General Staff, the Minister of Defense, and the ROC President.
Internal units: Personnel, Combat Readiness & Training, Logistics, Planning, Combat Systems, General Affairs, Comptroller, Inspector General, Political Warfare.
Naval Fleets Command
124th Fleet: Zuoying District, Kaohsiung City
131st Fleet: Keelung City, Taiwan
146th Fleet: Magong City, Penghu County, Taiwan 
Amphibious Fleet (151st Fleet), Zuoying District, Kaohsiung City
168th Fleet: Suao, Yilan County, Taiwan
192nd Fleet (Navy Minesweeper Fleet): Zuoying District, Kaohsiung City
256th Submarine Squadron: Zuoying District, Kaohsiung City
261st Squadron
Hai Chiao(Sea Dragon) PGMG Guided Missile Boat/Craft Group
 1st Hai Chiao Guided Missile Boat/Craft Squadron of 10  at Suao naval base
 2nd Hai Chiao Guided Missile Boat/Craft Squadron of 10 Kuang Hua VI-class missile boat
 3rd Hai Chiao Guided Missile Boat/Craft Squadron of 10 Hai Ou-class missile boat (Dvora class)
 4th Hai Chiao Guided Missile Boat/Craft Squadron of 10 Hai Ou-class missile boat (Dvora class)
 5th Hai Chiao Guided Missile Boat/Craft Squadron of 11 Kuang Hua VI-class missile boat
Hai Feng Shore Based Anti-ship Missile Group, operates 6 batteries of fixed/mobile HF-2 anti-ship missiles.
7th Hai Feng Shore Based Anti-ship Missile Squadron, Haulien, Eastern Taiwan.
Aviation Command (operates from Pingtung, Tsoying, and Hualien AB)
Naval Aviation, at Pingtung, will receive 12 P-3C 2013/2014.
1st ASW Aviation Group
133rd Squadron: S-2T, at Pingtung.
134th Squadron: S-2T, at Pingtung.
2nd ASW Aviation Group
701st Helicopter Squadron (Light), S-70C(M)-1, at Hualien.
702nd Helicopter Squadron (Light), S-70C(M)-2, at Tsoying.
501st Helicopter Squadron (Light), 500MD ASW, at Tsoying.
Maintenance Group
1st Maintenance Squadron (Pingtung)
2nd Maintenance Squadron (Tsoying)
3rd Maintenance Squadron (Hualien)
Marine Corps Command
Education, Training and Doctrine Command
Logistics Command
Naval Academy, Hydrographic & Oceanographic Bureau, Shipbuilding Development Center, Communication Systems, General Service.

Sources:

History

1912–1949

The precursor to the modern ROC Navy was established as the Ministry of the Navy in the Provisional Government of the Republic of China in 1911 following the overthrow of the Qing dynasty. Liu Guanxiong, a former Qing dynasty admiral, became the first Minister of Navy of the Republic of China. During the period of warlordism that scared China in the 1920s and 1930s the ROCN remained loyal to the Kuomintang government of Sun Yat-sen instead of the warlord government in Beijing which fell to the nationalist government in the 1928 northern campaign and between the civil war with the Communist Party and 1937 Japanese invasion of Northeast China. During that time and throughout World War II, the ROCN concentrated mainly on riverine warfare as the poorly equipped ROCN was not a match to Imperial Japanese Navy over ocean or coast.

Following World War II, a number of Japanese destroyers and decommissioned U.S. ships were transferred to the ROC Navy. During the Chinese Civil War, the ROCN was involved in the protection of supply convoys and the withdrawal of the ROC Government and over 1 million refugees to Taiwan in 1949. The subsequent reorganization and reestablishment of the Navy after evacuation to Taiwan is referenced in the lyrics of the post 1949 ROC Navy Song "The New Navy".

1945–present

In 1895, the island of Taiwan was placed under Japanese rule, with the Imperial Japanese Navy responsible for defending the waters of Taiwan and Penghu. After World War II, on 25 October 1945, the jurisdiction of Taiwan and Penghu was transferred to the Republic of China and the ROCN began its operation in that territory.

Following the relocation of the ROC government to Taiwan, the ROCN was involved in a number of commando attack escorts, evacuation and transport of more displaced soldiers and later to provide patrols and resupply operations to Kinmen and Matsu in the Taiwan Strait and South China Sea offshore islands.

Since the 1990s the Navy has grown in importance as the emphasis of the ROC's military doctrine moves towards countering a possible People's Republic of China (PRC) blockade, as well as offshore engagement. As of 2004 the ROCN had been working hard to expand its capability in electronic and anti-submarine warfare, as well as the replacement of antiquated warships and support vessels. While for many years the ROCN operated hand me down and foreign designed vessels in recent years they have been operating a higher number of indigenous platforms, sensors, and weapons much of it made by the National Chung-Shan Institute of Science and Technology.

In 2018 Lungteh Shipbuilding was awarded a contract to produce eleven Tuo Chiang Block II corvettes and four minelayers for the Taiwanese Navy.

In April 2020 in response to the COVID-19 pandemic the ROCN cut short their semi-annual goodwill mission to Central and South America. The flotilla consisting of two frigates and a supply vessel was subject to 30 days of quarantine after returning to Taiwan.

In April 2020 Taiwanese boatbuilder Karmin International Co., Ltd. won a NT$450-million (US$14.9-million) contract to supply the Republic of China Navy with eighteen special operations watercraft and eight RIB tenders, the later for the Cheng Kung-class frigates. Delivery is scheduled for June 2022. The contract covered only the watercraft themselves with their machine guns, infrared equipment, and boarding ladders sourced separately.

Rank and rating insignia

Officer ranks

Other ranks

Equipment 

Traditionally, most ROCN equipment has been purchased from the United States. The ships themselves have often been older, second-hand vessels without the newest technology. More recently, however, several ships have been built domestically under licence or through domestic development. The ROCN has also purchased s from France and s from the Netherlands as well as four U.S.  (renamed Keelung) destroyers originally intended for Iran.

Despite the ROCN refurbishing and extending the service life of its vessels and equipment, it has suffered from procurement difficulties due to pressures exerted by the PRC. It has only two useful submarines. The U.S. has approved sales of eight new diesel-powered submarines but lacks the manufacturing capability to make the engines; at the same time, threats from the PRC prevent the necessary technology transfer from other countries. Furthermore, the Legislative Yuan did not approve the budget and thereby slowed the opportunity to procure the badly needed underwater defense capability.

On 12 September 2007, an arms notification was sent to the United States Congress concerning an order for 12 P-3C Orion patrol aircraft and 3 "spare aircraft", along with an order for 144 SM-2 Block IIIA surface-to-air missiles. A contract was awarded to Lockheed Martin to refurbish the 12 P-3C Orion aircraft for the ROC on 13 March 2009, with deliveries to start in 2012.

In 2008, the ROCN set out to acquire an improved anti-ship capability. On 26 August, an arms notification was sent to Congress for an order for 60 air-launched Harpoon Block II missiles for the 12 P-3Cs. At least a portion of these missiles will be installed on the navy's s.

On 29 January 2010, the U.S. government announced five notifications to the U.S. Congress for arms sales to the ROC. In the contracts total US$6.392 billion, ROC Navy would get 2 s for US$105 million, 25 Link 16 terminals on ships for US$340 million, 10 ship- and 2 air-launched Harpoon L/II for US$37 million.

The ROC Navy already has 95 older Harpoon missiles in its inventory for the 8 s, 22 newer RGM-84L for the 4 Kidd-class destroyers, 32 sub-launched Harpoon II on order for the 2 Hai Lung-class submarines, and with 60 air-launched Harpoon Block II anti-ship missile on order for the 12 P-3Cs, plus the newly announced 10 ship-launched and 2 air-launched Harpoon II/L sales.

On 31 August 2010, it was announced for the next year's defense budget, ROCN planned to lease one or two more s (LST) from the United States, but the 900-ton stealth corvette plan was put on hold, due to lack of funds. That same year, On 29 September, the U.S. Congress passed a resolution, authorizing the U.S. Government for the sale of one more Osprey-class minehunter to the ROC.

Other ongoing local upgrade programs include locally designed and built Ching Chiang class of 12 patrol ships that were designed back in the 1990s to carry four HF-1 anti-ship missiles on board but only the lead ship of the class had them. Since 2006, seven ships of this class were upgraded to carry four HF-2/3 with W-160 fire control radar from Wu Chin III program (as well as Honeywell H-930 MCS CDS stripped from seven retired Yang-class Wu Chin 3 anti-air warfare destroyers). In 2010 more ships of this class were undergoing this same upgrade program but using CSIST produced fire control radars instead. Currently four different variants exist within this class, the original Ching Chiang patrol ship constructed with four HF-1 (one existing in this configuration).

On 29 December 2010, two LSTs and four remaining of Adjutant-class coastal minehunters were retired.

In 2011, the navy retired several vessels. On 31 October, all eight PCL in the 124th Fleet were retired. On 28 December, the two Lung Jiang-class (PSMM Mk5) guided missile patrol boats (PGG 601 and PPG 602) of the 131st Fleet were retired from ROC Navy service, after entering service in 1978 and 1981 respectively.

In June 2018, two s of the US Navy, ex- and ex-, were handed over to the Government of Taiwan for the Republic of China Navy. The transfer cost was an estimated US$177 million. The transfer of the ships includes the advanced AN/SQR-19 Multi-Function Towed array sonar. Taiwan had previously been blocked from acquiring the AN/SQR-19, and the transfer of the system points to an anti-submarine focus in line with the Knox-class frigates they will likely replace.

The keel of a new rescue and salvage ship was laid in March 2022.

Indigenous "Landing Platform Dock" / Amphibious Assault Ship

In September 2018, Taiwan confirms contract for first amphibious assault ship built in Taiwan. It will be built by CSBC Corporation, a local shipyard. Four are planned with the first to be entering service around 2021. It is roughly similar to US Navy's San Antonio class, but with a slightly smaller displacement. Support features include a full hospital, well deck, full aviation facilities, storage for wheeled vehicles, and dedicated accommodations for a full battalion of Marines. The vessel design will be armed with a 76 mm naval gun in the primary position, a close-in weapon system (CIWS) turret, two 12.7 mm machine gun positions in the forward section, and launchers that can deploy the Hsiung Feng II and III family of anti-ship and land-attack cruise missiles. The primary sensor is expected to be a naval version of the indigenous CS/MPQ-90 Bee Eye AESA radar.

Fleet Air Defense Upgrade / Hsun Lien Project
The ROC Navy currently lacks a modern fleet defense system. Its destroyers currently use obsolete Mark 26 missile launchers designed from the 1970s and does not currently have a modern centralized air defense combat system like the Aegis. Past US administrations rejected the sale of Aegis radar system and Arleigh Burke-class destroyers, including George W. Bush in 2001. Under the George W. Bush administration, the US instead sold Taiwan four Kidd-class destroyers, which did not carry the Aegis and were no longer in service in the US Navy at the time. However, in January 2019, the US government delivered two sets of Mk 41 VLS to Taiwan. The ROC government plans to integrate the MK41 VLS and locally developed Tien-Kung III (Sky Bow III) with its indigenously developed Hsun Lien naval combat system, which is similar to Aegis, to upgrade its ship air defense capabilities. Taiwan has acquired the license and technology to produce additional MK 41 VLS launchers. The ROC Navy currently as of 2019 possesses at least 14 warships compatible with the Mk41. Additionally, the AN/SLQ-32 system on the Kee Lung class guided missile destroyers (formerly Kidd-Class Destroyers) will be upgraded and is expected to be completed by 2023. In November 2019 it was reported that the decommissioned amphibious landing ship Kao Hsiung (LCC-1) was being used as a test ship for the Hsun Lien naval combat system project and had been fitted with a large phased array radar system and the Mark 41 Vertical Launching System. In January 2020, it is reported the Tien-Kung III (Sky Bow III) is successfully fired from the Mark 41 Vertical Launching System.

Indigenous Defense Submarine (IDS) Program

In November 2020, President Tsai Ing-wen opened the submarine construction facility in Kaohsiung with plans to build eight submarines. Construction was to begin with a prototype boat which was to be built over 78 months. The first boat is scheduled to enter service in 2025. Between December 2020 and February 2021, the United States reportedly approved the export of three key systems to Taiwan for the program: digital sonar systems, integrated combat systems and auxiliary equipment systems (periscopes).

Surface fleet

Destroyers (4 in service)

Frigates (22 in service)

Corvettes (11 in service)

Fast attack missile craft  (31 in service)

Mine warfare vessels (11 in service)

Amphibious ships (8 in service)

Submarine fleet

Submarines (4 in service)

Auxiliary fleet

Auxiliary ships (8 in service)

Aircraft

Fixed-wing

Helicopters

Armament

Surface-to-air missiles

Anti-ship missiles

CIWS

Torpedoes

Gallery

Bases

 Tsoying Naval Base – 1st Naval District HQ, largest naval base in Taiwan and naval airfield near Kaohsiung
 Tsoying Naval Airfield and Naval Yard – Tsoying District
 Makung Naval Base (Makung, Pescadores) – 2nd Naval District HQ – home to attack squadrons, training centre and naval yard
 Keelung Naval Base, Keelung – 3rd Naval District HQ, home to northern patrol and transport squadrons and small naval yard
 Suao Naval Base, Su-ao, Yilan – East Coast Command and supports Keelung Naval Base

All remaining bases are small naval stations supporting PCL class small patrol boats and Fast Attack Boat:

 Anping Naval Base, Anping
 Hsinchu Naval Base, Hsinchu
 Hualien Naval Base, Hualien
 Kenting Naval Base, Hengchun
 Tamshui Naval Base, Tamshui
 Wu Chi Naval Base, Wuqi District

Naval Maritime and Surveillance Command
The Naval Maritime and Surveillance Command overseas a network of surveillance radar stations across Taiwan. These include high altitude sites like Hsiaohsuehshan which is located at more than 3,000m above sea level. The high altitude sites pose unique challenges to the Navy as they are often located in inaccessible areas and experience extreme weather including months of snow in the winter.

In May 2021 the navy ordered a new series of shore based medium-to-long range maritime surveillance radars from NCSIST. Because the radar system will likely come under attack in a war the navy has been pulling staff back to central command centers.

See also

 List of Republic of China Navy ships
 Ministry of National Defense (Republic of China)
 Republic of China Naval Academy
 Coast Guard Administration (Taiwan)
 Political status of Taiwan
 People's Liberation Army Navy (PLAN) – The naval forces of the People's Republic of China (PRC)
 Republic of China Navy rank and rating insignia for the rank and rating system of the ROCN (Including the Marine Corps)
 Maritime industries of Taiwan
 Taiwan frigate scandal

Notes

References

External links
ROC Navy website
Globalsecurity.org report on the ROC Navy

 
1924 establishments in China